Anjane Mein is a 1978 Bollywood romantic drama film directed by Samir Ganguly. The film stars Rishi Kapoor and Neetu Singh in lead roles.

Cast
Rishi Kapoor as Raja 
Neetu Singh as Rani
Nirupa Roy as Mrs. Shanti Lal 
Ranjeet as Ranjeet 
Asha Sachdev as Rita 
Jagdeep as Abdullah 
Satyendra Kapoor as Manohar Lal 
Ramesh Deo as Inspector Gavaskar 
Anwar Hussain as Sher Singh

Soundtrack
Lyrics: Gulshan Bawra

References

External links
 

1978 films
1970s Hindi-language films
Films scored by Kalyanji Anandji
Films directed by Samir Ganguly
Indian romantic drama films